Lava is a heavy-duty hand cleaner in soap bar form manufactured by the WD-40 Company. Unlike typical soap bars, Lava contains ground pumice, which gave the soap its name. The soap and pumice combination is intended to scour tar, engine grease, paint, dirt, grime, filth, and similar substances from the skin. The original Lava soap (without moisturizers), which was a beige-colored bar, is no longer manufactured.

Lava soap was developed in 1893 by the William Waltke Company of St. Louis. In 1927, Procter & Gamble acquired the Lava and Oxydol brands from William Waltke Company. P&G sold the Lava brand to Block Drug in 1995. The WD-40 Company acquired the brand from Block Drug in April 1999.

References

External links
 Lava Soap Official Website

Former Procter & Gamble brands
Products introduced in 1893
Soap brands